The March for Truth was a nationwide protest that occurred on Saturday, June 3, 2017, calling for a fair and impartial investigation into possible connections between Russia and President Donald Trump's campaign and administration. Demonstrations were scheduled to place in Washington, D.C., and more than 100 additional cities; publicly called for events in more than 150 US cities.  Scheduled speakers included Javier Muñoz and Jill Wine-Banks, as well as other actors and musicians.

Planning 
The organizers for the national event included Jordan Uhl, Megan Mamula, Jimmy Dahman, Andrea Chalupa, and Justin Hendrix. The event started as a small protest planned for Washington, D.C., but grew into a nationwide protest. In Iowa and in other states, local Women's March organizers helped support the planning for the March for Truth. Other groups, such as Indivisible and Public Citizen, were also involved with support for the marches and rallies.

Locations

United States 

 Austin, Texas, around 150 people were present at Austin City Hall by noon on Saturday.
 Bedminster, New Jersey, took place in coordination with New Jersey Working Families, Action Together NJ and the Somerset County Democrats.
 In Boise, Idaho, demonstrators will march outside the Idaho State Capitol.
 Boston, Massachusetts
 Charlotte, North Carolina
 The Chicago march will begin at Federal Plaza. There were around 2,000 people at the march and rally.
 Denver had around 300 demonstrators.
 Eugene, Oregon
 New York City, demonstrators rallied in Foley Square and marched down Broadway.
 Northampton, Massachusetts
 Marchers in Orlando, Florida will gather in front of the Orange County Courthouse.
 Portland, Oregon
 Pottstown, Pennsylvania
 Philadelphia
 San Diego, California
 San Francisco
 Seattle, Washington, where several hundred people marched through the downtown area after gathering at Cal Anderson Park.
 St. Joseph, Missouri

International 
 London

See also
 Links between Trump associates and Russian officials
 Steele dossier
 Timeline of Russian interference in the 2016 United States elections
 Timeline of Russian interference in the 2016 United States elections (July 2016–election day)

References

External links 

 

2017 in American politics
2017 protests
June 2017 events in the United States
Protests against Donald Trump